Black and White is a 1913 American silent comedy film featuring Harry Carey.

Cast
 Harry Carey
 Donald Crisp
 Grace Henderson
 Dave Morris as The Tramp
 Clarence Barr as The Gardener (as Clarence L. Barr)

See also
 List of American films of 1913
 Harry Carey filmography

External links

1913 films
American silent short films
American black-and-white films
1913 comedy films
1913 short films
Silent American comedy films
American comedy short films
Films directed by Dell Henderson
1910s American films